Stéphanie Guardia is a French former ice dancer. With Franck Laporte, she is the 1995 World Junior silver medalist and 1995 International St. Gervais bronze medalist.

Competitive highlights 
(with Laporte)

References 

French female ice dancers
Living people
World Junior Figure Skating Championships medalists
Year of birth missing (living people)
20th-century French women